In mathematics, in the field of topology, a topological space is called supercompact if there is a subbasis such that every open cover of the topological space from elements of the subbasis has a subcover with at most two subbasis elements.  Supercompactness and the related notion of superextension was introduced by J. de Groot in 1967.

Examples
By the Alexander subbase theorem, every supercompact space is compact. Conversely, many (but not all) compact spaces are supercompact. The following are examples of supercompact spaces:
 Compact linearly ordered spaces with the order topology and all continuous images of such spaces

 A product of supercompact spaces is supercompact (like a similar statement about compactness, Tychonoff's theorem, it is equivalent to the axiom of choice.)

Properties
Some compact Hausdorff spaces are not supercompact; such an example is given by the Stone–Čech compactification of the natural numbers (with the discrete topology).

A continuous image of a supercompact space need not be supercompact.

In a supercompact space (or any continuous image of one), the cluster point of any countable subset is the limit of a nontrivial convergent sequence.

Notes

References

 

 

 

Compactness (mathematics)
Properties of topological spaces